Blake Street railway station serves the Hill Hook area of Sutton Coldfield, Birmingham, England.  It is situated on the Cross-City Line, located on the county boundary between the West Midlands and Staffordshire.  The station is managed by West Midlands Trains, who operate all trains serving it.

History
The station opened in 1884, when the London and North Western Railway extended their Birmingham to Sutton Coldfield line northward to Lichfield. The northern end was subsequently extended to Lichfield Trent Valley in 1988 and electrified on the 25 kV AC system in 1992. The signalling at the station is set up so that trains can terminate or start from here, but the facility is only rarely used in the current (May 2018) timetable (just one each way Monday-Saturday).

Facilities
The station has a staffed ticket office on the southbound side at street level, staffed on a part-time basis.  A self-service ticket machine (located next to the booking office) is also available for use when the office is closed.  At platform level, there is a waiting shelter on the northbound side and a waiting room on the southbound platform.  CIS displays, timetable posters, customer help points and automated announcements provide train running information.  Step-free access to both platforms is available via ramps from street level.

Services
The station is served by West Midlands Trains with local Transport for West Midlands branded "Cross-City" services, operated by Class 323 electrical multiple units with an average journey time to Birmingham New Street of around 29 minutes.
On Mondays to Saturdays, two trains per operate southbound; to Bromsgrove via Longbridge. Northbound there are also two trains per hour, to Lichfield Trent Valley. On Sundays, trains run every 30 minutes between Lichfield Trent Valley and Redditch.

References

External links

Rail Around Birmingham and the West Midlands: Blake Street station

Sutton Coldfield
Railway stations in Birmingham, West Midlands
DfT Category E stations
Former London and North Western Railway stations
Railway stations in Great Britain opened in 1884
Railway stations served by West Midlands Trains